Jai Telangana TV is a Telugu language news television channel in the southern Indian state of Telangana. It is owned and operated by Associated Broadcasting Company Private Limited (ABCL) which also owns the another news channel TV9 Telugu.

References

Telugu-language television channels
24-hour television news channels in India
Television stations in Hyderabad